Stefano Ferronato (born 29 December 1968 in Cortina d'Ampezzo) is an Italian curler.

At the national level, he is a seven-time Italian men's champion curler.

Teams

References

External links

Living people
1968 births
People from Cortina d'Ampezzo
Italian male curlers
Italian curling champions
Sportspeople from the Province of Belluno